Mucinous nevus is a rare cutaneous condition characterized by hamartoma that can be congenital or acquired.

See also 
 MRI burn
 List of cutaneous conditions

References 

Epidermal nevi, neoplasms, and cysts